Jonas Michelbrink (born 23 June 2001) is a German footballer who plays as a midfielder for MSV Duisburg.

Club career
Michelbrink made his professional debut for Hertha BSC in the Bundesliga on 12 May 2021, coming on as a substitute in the 76th minute for Javairô Dilrosun against Schalke 04. The away match finished as a 2–1 win. In August 2022, he moved to MSV Duisburg.

International career
Michelbrink made one appearance for the Germany national under-17 team in October 2017 against Denmark.

Career statistics

References

External links
 
 
 
 

2001 births
Living people
Footballers from Hanover
German footballers
German people of Lithuanian descent
Germany youth international footballers
Association football midfielders
Hertha BSC II players
Hertha BSC players
MSV Duisburg players
Bundesliga players
3. Liga players
Regionalliga players